Funya no Kiyomi (文室 浄三, 693 - October 9, 770), born Prince Chinu (智努王), was a former member of the Imperial Family, nobleman and politician in Japan during Asuka and Nara periods. He served as Major Counselor (Gyoshitaifu) in the Imperial Court and held the court rank of Junior Second Rank. He was the son of Prince Naga and the grandson of Emperor Tenmu.

Life 
Prince Chinu was born in 693 as the son of Prince Naga, the son of Emperor Tenmu, during the reign of Empress Jitō.

In 717, Prince Chinu received the court rank of Junior Fourth Rank, and in 740, he advanced to Senior Fourth Rank.

After serving as Head of Bureau of Carpentry (Moku no Kami), Minister of Imperial Palace Construction (Zōgūkyō), and Head of Bureau of Imperial Villa Construction (Zōrikyūshi), he was given Junior Third Rank in 747.

In 752, he received the surname Funya and the kabane Mahito. In 757, he became Sangi and advanced to the court rank of Junior Second Rank and Gyoshitaifu (later known as Dainagon).

After the death of Empress Kōken, he received support to become the crown prince but declined the offer.

Funya no Kiyomi died on October 9, 770 at the age of 78.

Family 

 Father: Prince Naga
 Mother: Unknown
 Wife: Princess Matta (Lord of Matta)
 Children of unknown birth mother
 Son: Prince Sawa
 Son: Funya no Yoki
 Son: Funya no Mayamaro
 Ninth son: Mimuro no Ōhara (? - 806)
 Daughter: Queen Okaya

References 

Imperial House of Japan
Japanese nobility
693 births
770 deaths